Eileen Adelaide Bruce (15 February 1905 Petersham, London – 6 October 1955 London) was an English taxonomist and botanist.

Life 
She was educated at the University College of London and joined the staff of Kew in 1930. In 1941 after the start of World War II she enlisted in the Auxiliary Territorial Service, was commissioned and served in the Anti-Aircraft Command. After the end of hostilities she was appointed to the South African National Herbarium in Pretoria in 1946. During her stay there she worked on a number of plant families, in particular the Labiatae and also on a revision of the genus Kniphofia. Her work was published in Bothalia and Flowering Plants of Africa. In 1952 she returned to Kew working on the families of Pedaliaceae and Loganiaceae, contributing to the Flora of Tropical East Africa and the Kew Bulletin.

References

Further reading

1905 births
1954 deaths
Alumni of University College London
Botanists active in Kew Gardens
British taxonomists
Women taxonomists